William Bondy (April 9, 1870 – March 30, 1964) was a United States district judge of the United States District Court for the Southern District of New York from 1923 to 1964 and its Chief Judge from 1955 to 1956.

Education and career

Born on April 9, 1870, in New York City, New York, Bondy received a Bachelor of Arts degree in 1890, a Master of Arts degree in 1891 and a Doctor of Philosophy in 1892, all from Columbia University. He received a Bachelor of Laws in 1893 from Columbia Law School. He was in private practice in New York City from 1893 to 1923.

Federal judicial service

Bondy was nominated by President Warren G. Harding on February 28, 1923, to a seat on the United States District Court for the Southern District of New York vacated by Judge Julius Marshuetz Mayer. He was confirmed by the United States Senate on March 2, 1923, and received his commission the same day. He served as Chief Judge from 1955 to 1956. He assumed senior status on May 1, 1956. His service terminated on March 30, 1964, due to his death in New York City.

References

Sources

External links
 

1870 births
1964 deaths
Judges of the United States District Court for the Southern District of New York
United States district court judges appointed by Warren G. Harding
20th-century American judges
Columbia Law School alumni